Salvatore T. DeMatteo (July 14, 1911 – August 8, 2003) was an American lawyer and politician from New York.

Life
He was born on July 14, 1911. He attended Brooklyn Technical High School, St.John's College and St. John's Law School, and while studying worked as a telegraph messenger, as a newspaper copyboy, and wrote articles for an Italian-language paper. He was admitted to the bar, and practiced law in Brooklyn.

DeMatteo was a member of the New York State Assembly in 1938, elected in November 1937 on the American Labor ticket in the 16th assembly district of Brooklyn. He was defeated for re-election in 1938, 1940 and 1941.

In February 1960, he was elected as Executive Secretary of the Liberal Party in Brooklyn.

He was a justice of the Brooklyn Civil Court from 1969 to 1973, a justice of the New York Supreme Court from 1974 to 1981, and then an Official Referee (i.e. a senior judge on an additional seat) of the Supreme Court.

He died on August 8, 2003; and was buried at the St. Charles Cemetery in Farmingdale.

Sources

1911 births
2003 deaths
Members of the New York State Assembly
American Labor Party politicians
Politicians from Brooklyn
New York Supreme Court Justices
Liberal Party of New York politicians
St. John's University School of Law alumni
20th-century American judges
American people of Italian descent
20th-century American politicians